Surface Water Simulation Modelling Programme (SWSMP) launched in 1986 by the Ministry of Water Resources of Bangladesh Government under the Master Planning Organization to develop a high level of analytical capabilities by use of state-of-the-art mathematical water modelling which was the genesis of what at present is known as the Institute of Water Modelling (IWM).

References

Science and technology in Bangladesh
1986 establishments in Bangladesh
Water supply and sanitation in Bangladesh